Ieremia Tienang Tabai  (modern spelling: Tabwai; born 16 December 1949) is an I-Kiribati politician who served as the first Beretitenti President of the Republic of Kiribati, after being the youngest ever Chief minister of the Commonwealth of Nations and then becoming the youngest ever head of State. During his presidency, he was described as being the most able leader of the Pacific island states.

Biography 

He was born in Nonouti in 1949, and went to New Zealand to receive his education (St Andrew's College, Christchurch and then the 
Victoria University of Wellington). He returned to the Gilbert and Ellice Islands, married with a woman from Ellice Islands and worked one year as an accountant at the Treasury. One year later, in 1974 general election, he was elected to the House of Assembly of the Gilbert and Ellice Islands, representing Nonouti.

In 1976, the Gilbert Islands, now separated from Tuvalu a few months earlier, received self-government, and Tabai served as leader of the Opposition in a Westminster system dominated less by formal political parties than by loose coalitions of like-minded members. In this position, he regularly expressed criticism of the perceived centralist tendencies of Chief minister Naboua Ratieta's government, expressing particular distaste for Ratieta's plans for an expensive defence department and the westernisation he was bringing to Kiribati. He fought in favor of traditional Gilbertese culture, helped to publicise the complaints of village copra growers, and criticized what he saw as a disproportionate amount of government expenditure on Tarawa over the other islands. Tabai became elected Chief Minister in March 1978, aged only 27, the youngest ever in the Commonwealth of Nations.

He demonstrated a talent for negotiation when he led his government in discussions with the United Kingdom over a financial settlement regarding the demands of the Banabans for compensation for the loss of their ancestral homeland of Banaba (Ocean Island), which had been devastated by phosphate mining, and their demands that it become independent of Kiribati. In 1979 Tabai was made a Companion of the Order of St Michael and St George (CMG) by Queen Elizabeth II, and became Beretitenti of the Republic of Kiribati at independence on 12 July 1979. He served not only as the last Chief Minister before independence, and he became Beretitenti by force of law — from 1979 until 1982, then from 1983 until 1991, with a short interruption from 1982 until 1983, serving the maximum number of terms allowed by law. He was first elected to the office of Beretitenti in April 1982, but he lost a vote of no confidence in December 1982, so he was then replaced by an acting president until his re-election in February 1983. His third and last term, from 1987 to 1991, has been subject to legal issue, because the Constitution of Kiribati limits to a maximum of 3 terms, but the High Court rejected the case for procedural reasons.

In 1982, he received an honorary knighthood from the Queen - Knight Grand Cross of the Order of St Michael and St George (GCMG).

Tabai was a member of the National Progressive Party. As Beretitenti, he displayed a strong aversion to being dependent on aid, saying at one point the people were "better poor but free". During his administration, he signed a deal for tuna with fishing authorities from the Soviet Union. The Soviets chose not to renew the deal, saying that the catch they gathered was not worth the licensing fee Tabai demanded. Under his administration, the government also placed its earnings from phosphate mining in a trust fund. The interest from the fund had been used to pay for development projects.

After retiring from politics, Tabai served as Secretary-General of the Pacific Islands Forum from 1992 until 1998.

He received the highest honor of Kiribati, the Kiribati Grand Order, in 1992.

In May 1996 he was appointed an Honorary Officer of the Order of Australia, "for service to Australian-Pacific Islands countries relations, particularly as Secretary-General to the South Pacific Forum".

In 1999 he was fined for trying to establish an independent radio station in Kiribati, which he described as "censorship". In 2000, he founded a newspaper, The Kiribati Newstar.

Tabai returned to politics and was re-elected to the Kiribati parliament, again representing Nonouti, in 2007. He retained his seat in the 2011, the 2015-16, and the 2020 elections. He is aligned with the Boutokaan te Koaua party, then Kamanoan Kiribati Party.

References

RNZ interview 2011: Sir Ieremia Tabai - Berititente [sic] 

1949 births
Living people
People from Nonouti
Presidents of Kiribati
Members of the House of Assembly (Kiribati)
Secretaries General of the Pacific Islands Forum
National Progressive Party (Kiribati) politicians
Honorary Knights Grand Cross of the Order of St Michael and St George
Honorary Officers of the Order of Australia
People educated at St Andrew's College, Christchurch
Victoria University of Wellington alumni